The Norfolk golden whistler (Pachycephala pectoralis xanthoprocta), also known as the Norfolk Island whistler or Norfolk Island thickhead, and locally as the “tamey”, is a small bird in the whistler family, Pachycephalidae.  It is a subspecies of the Australian golden whistler and endemic to Norfolk Island, an Australian territory in the Tasman Sea, between Australia and New Zealand.

Description
Males of the Norfolk Island subspecies differ from those of other subspecies in lacking the bright yellow, white and black markings and being similar to the females, though somewhat yellower.  Relative to most other subspecies it is smaller, with a longer tail and heavier bill.

Distribution and habitat
The whistler is restricted to Norfolk Island, where it is largely confined to the Mt Pitt section of the Norfolk Island National Park and remnant wooded areas within 2 km of the park.  It inhabits shrubby understorey in subtropical rainforest, palm forest and Norfolk Island pines, as well as in regenerating forest.  It also visits gardens.

Status and conservation 
After a period of decline during the 1960s and 1970s, the population of the Norfolk golden whistler was estimated in 2005 at 535 breeding pairs.  Ongoing threats include habitat degradation and predation by black rats and feral cats.  It is considered vulnerable because of the restricted size of the population and area of its distribution.  Ongoing conservation management actions include control of rats and feral cats to minimise predation as well as control of invasive weeds to minimise habitat degradation.  It is proposed to reintroduce the whistler to nearby Phillip Island when the regenerating habitat there is suitable.

Notes

References 
 Commonwealth of Australia. (2005). National Recovery Plan for the Norfolk Island Scarlet Robin, Petroica multicolor multicolor, and the Norfolk Island Golden Whistler Pachycephala pectoralis xanthoprocta. Department of the Environment and Heritage, Canberra. 
 Garnett, Stephen T.; & Crowley, Gabriel M. (2000). The Action Plan for Australian Birds 2000. Environment Australia: Canberra. 
 Higgins, P.J.; & Peter, J.M. (eds). (2003). Handbook of Australian, New Zealand and Antarctic Birds.  Volume 6: Pardalotes to Shrike-thrushes. Oxford University Press: Melbourne.  
 Schodde, R.; & Mason, I.J. (1999). The Directory of Australian Birds: Passerines. CSIRO Publishing: Melbourne. 

Birds of Norfolk Island
Pachycephala
Birds described in 1838